Daniel Carl Peterson (born January 15, 1953) is a former professor of Islamic Studies and Arabic in the Department of Asian and Near Eastern Languages at Brigham Young University (BYU).

Background
A native of southern California, Peterson received a bachelor's degree in Greek and philosophy from BYU and, after several years of study in Jerusalem and Cairo, earned a Ph.D. in Near Eastern Languages and Cultures from the University of California, Los Angeles (UCLA). Peterson is currently a professor of Islamic Studies and Arabic at BYU, where he teaches courses in Arabic language and Islamic religion, history and culture. He has authored several books and numerous articles on Islamic and Latter-day Saint topics. He also founded and served as director of BYU's Middle Eastern Texts Initiative from 1992–2010.

Peterson has served in various capacities including chairman of the board for what is now known as BYU's Neal A. Maxwell Institute for Religious Scholarship. In 2007, in recognition of his establishment of the Middle Eastern Texts Initiative, Peterson was named a Utah Academy Fellow and declared a lifetime member of the Utah Academy of Sciences, Arts, and Letters.

Peterson is also known for his work as an apologist and scholar on subjects dealing with claims of the Church of Jesus Christ of Latter-day Saints (LDS Church), of which he is a member. He is the former editor-in-chief of the FARMS Review (now the Mormon Studies Review), a periodical produced by the Foundation for Ancient Research and Mormon Studies. The institute ended his connection with it in June 2012. Peterson is also a regular participant in online fora about Mormonism where he discusses the LDS faith and its apologetics. One of his projects has been the development of a website featuring the testimonies of LDS scholars. Peterson is the first and current editor-in-chief of Interpreter: A Journal of Latter-day Saint Faith and Scholarship.

Peterson served an LDS Church mission in the Switzerland Zurich Mission, with Edwin Q. Cannon serving as his mission president.  Peterson later served on the LDS Church's Gospel Doctrine Committee and as a bishop.

Personal life
Peterson and his wife, the former Deborah Stephens, have three sons.

Publications 
.
.
.

.

References

External links
 
 
 

Living people
1953 births
20th-century Mormon missionaries
American Latter Day Saint writers
American Mormon missionaries in Switzerland
Brigham Young University alumni
Brigham Young University faculty
Mormon apologists
Mormon studies scholars
Maxwell Institute people
University of California, Los Angeles alumni
Christian scholars of Islam
Latter Day Saints from California
Latter Day Saints from Utah
American expatriates in Egypt
American expatriates in Israel
Book of Mormon scholars